Santiago Morning Femenino is a Chilean women's football club from La Pintana, Santiago representing Santiago Morning in the Chilean women's championship. It was founded in 2008.

Santiago Morning won their first title in the 2018 Championship.

Honours

Domestic
 Primera División: 3
 2018, 2019 and Transición 2020.

Players

Current squad
as of 25 Feb 2023

References

Universidad de Chile
Sport in Santiago
2008 establishments in Chile